Otto Buchinger (February 16, 1878 at Darmstadt – April 16, 1966 at Überlingen) was a German physician, credited with being the first to systematically document the beneficial effects of fasting on a number of diseases.

Buchinger studied medicine at the Ludwigs-University in Gießen, Germany. After his promotion, he went to the German Navy as an army physician. In 1917 he was discharged due to illness; he suffered from tonsillitis that never completely healed and led to rheumatism in his joints. According to his daughter Maria Buchinger, he took the advice of a physician colleague, fasting doctor Gustav Riedlin, and tried fasting for the first time.  After the 19th day of fasting, his condition started to improve rapidly. He then turned with full interest and enthusiasm to fasting as a therapy.

In 1920 he founded his small fasting clinic in Witzenhausen, Germany. Later in 1935 he founded his first real sanatorium in Bad Pyrmont. In that year developed the fasting method and described it in his book, "The Therapeutic Fasting Cure", published in the same year. In 1953 he founded a new clinic at Überlingen on Lake Constance, together with his daughter Maria Buchinger and son-in-law Helmut Wilhelmi. His grandson Raimund Wilhelmi led the Buchinger Wilhelmi clinic in Überlingen with his wife and scientific director Francoise Wilhelmi de Toledo until their son Leonard Wilhelmi took over the leadership from February 2019.

See also 
 Intermittent fasting
 List of diets
 Very-low-calorie diet or starvation diet

References

1878 births
1966 deaths
Fasting researchers
German military doctors
Physicians from Darmstadt